The Cyclo-cross Superprestige 2017-18 – also known as the Telenet Superprestige for sponsorship reasons – is a season long cyclo-cross competition held in Belgium and the Netherlands.

Calendar

Men's competition

Women's competition

Season standings
In each race, the top 15 riders gain points, going from 15 points for the winner decreasing by one point per position to 1 point for the rider finishing in 15th position. In case of ties in the total score of two or more riders, the following tie breakers exist: most races started, most races won, best result in the last race.

Standings after six races:

Men

Women (Top 5)

References

Cyclo-cross Superprestige
2018 in cyclo-cross
2017 in cyclo-cross